LuckyChap Entertainment is an American production company based in Los Angeles, founded in 2014 by Margot Robbie, Tom Ackerley, Josey McNamara and Sophia Kerr. The company describes their focal point as female-focused film and television productions.

LuckyChap Entertainment has produced films and television series including I, Tonya (2017), the Hulu TV series Dollface (2019),  Birds of Prey and Promising Young Woman (both 2020).

As of 2021, works produced by the company have received 8 Academy Award and 11 BAFTA nominations. In 2018, its first release I, Tonya, won the Academy Award Best Supporting Actress. Three years later, Promising Young Woman won the Academy Award for Best Original Screenplay and the BAFTAs for Best Original Screenplay and Outstanding British Film.

Formation 

The company was established by Margot Robbie, Tom Ackerley, Sophia Kerr and Josey McNamara. Robbie, an Australian actress, was primarily known as a film star, playing major roles in Wolf of Wall Street, Suicide Squad and The Legend of Tarzan. In 2018, she discussed how she previously had an interest in obtaining creative control from behind the camera, and how forming LuckyChap Entertainment gave her the ability to pursue.

Robbie and Kerr grew up together on the Gold Coast in Queensland, Australia. The British pair McNamara and Ackerley worked together for years as assistant directors. Robbie and Ackerley met on the set of the 2015 film Suite Française in 2013, and began dating in 2014, and were married in 2016. After getting drunk together at the London premiere of The Wolf of Wall Street, the four co-founders decided to move into a house together in Clapham, London. There, they conceived the idea of starting a production company. The name "LuckyChap" relates to Charlie Chaplin, though Robbie said that none of them could remember its exact meaning. Brett Hedblom serves as LuckyChap's Vice President of television.

Productions 
In 2017, LuckyChap Entertainment released their first major motion picture production I, Tonya, based on the life of American competitive ice skater Tonya Harding, played by Robbie. It had a budget of $11million and was their first theatrical release. I, Tonya earned an Academy Award for Allison Janney as Best Supporting Actress, a BAFTA and a Golden Globe Award, along with several nominations. L. Rose of The Hollywood Reporter described the movie's success as a demonstration of LuckyChap Entertainment's "instant credibility".

In 2018, LuckyChap released their next film Terminal, in partnership with Beagle Pug Films and Highland Film Group. The neo-noir thriller film, written and directed by Vaughn Stein and starring Margot Robbie, was filmed and produced prior to I, Tonya. It was unsuccessful at the box offices, grossing $843,970 in comparison to I, Tonyas gross of $53,939,297.

In 2019, the company, along with Automatik Entertainment and Paramount Pictures, premiered Dreamland, a 1930s-set action drama, which was filmed in 2017. Robbie stars as an outlaw on the run, with a teenage boy as a sidekick. Also in 2019, the company formed a partnership with Film Victoria, by taking part in Film Victoria's Placement Program. This program involved a young female producer from Film Victoria undertaking a six-month placement at LuckyChap.

Subsequently, LuckyChap began involvement in television production. Brett Hedlom became Vice President of television. They sold the comedy series Dollface to Hulu in 2018, and then began production and released the show in 2019. The show is also produced by ABC Signature Studios and Clubhouse Pictures, and stars Kat Dennings—a recently-single young woman who comes to terms with her imagination and old friendships.

Throughout 2019, the company also worked in the production of Birds of Prey (And the Fantabulous Emancipation of One Harley Quinn), which premiered in early 2020. Also produced by Clubhouse Pictures and Warner Bros and directed by Cathy Yan, it is the eighth instalment in the DC Extended Universe, as a spin-off of Suicide Squad (2016). It focuses on the super villain DC Comics character Harley Quinn who, after being dumped by the Joker, forms an all-female superhero team. It became LuckyChap's highest-grossing production to date, earning $200million worldwide.

Later on in 2020, the company released the female revenge fantasy Promising Young Woman, which was Emerald Fennell's first directorial feature. Also produced by FilmNation Entertainment and Focus Features, this black comedy film stars Carey Mulligan in her attempt to get revenge for the rape and consequent suicide of a female friend. This film earned an Academy Award, a BAFTA for Best Original Screenplay and another BAFTA for Outstanding British Film of the Year.

Focus 
LuckyChap has described itself as a company that aims to promote female stories from female storytellers, stating that they are filling a gap caused by gender inequality in the film industry, particularly in terms of writers and directors.

In 2019, LuckyChap partnered with Christina Hodson, the writer of action films including Birds of Prey (2020) and Bumblebee (2018), to form the 'Lucky Exports Pitch Program' (LEPP). The month-long program consisted of six female writers, including four women of color, in a writers' room. The writers workshopped ideas for action film projects.

As well as ensuring their crews are primarily female, LuckyChap have described that they aim to work on female-focused storylines. LuckyChap executive Margot Robbie said that she always gravitated towards playing male character roles, as she felt their storylines were better. A. Setianto and M. Win described Birds of Prey as intricately exploring the issues women face in trying to gain, independence. while N. Curtis and V. Cardo described Quinn as a female character who has control over her own body and sexuality.

Some people criticised LuckyChap on grounds of gender and feminism. A group of online fans and reviewers predicted that Birds of Prey would "flop" at the box office because the spin-off removed "any sex appeal" from the characters. Harper R. Oreck of The Harvard Crimson criticized Promising Young Woman as failing to be a feminist resistance piece.

Location 

The initial headquarters consisted of a small office space located on the Warner Bros lot in Los Angeles. After outgrowing their initial office space, LuckyChap decided to move into a bigger office in Downtown Los Angeles, where they designed an "open, collaborative environment", according to Architectural Digest  LuckyChap Entertainment said of the construction that they made an effort to keep a feminine aesthetic in the office, with features like their custom-made neon LuckyChap Entertainment sign.

Future 
LuckyChap Entertainment has a first-look deal with Warner Bros. Pictures and Warner Bros. Television to develop and produce films and television series. In this deal they have partnered with Mattel Films, the new theatrical film division of Mattel, and Warner Bros Pictures, to co-produce the upcoming Barbie adaptation, in which Robbie will star as Barbie. The film's initial planned 2017 release has been repeatedly delayed.

The company also sold their television project Shattered Glass to NBC under the Warner Bros Deal. Robbie and Hedblom decided to work with the ABC, Tracey Robertson and Nathan Mayfield from the Australian production company Hoodlum, ABC Studios International, and Robbie's agent Aran Michael from Aran Michael Management, on a 10-part series Shakespeare Now. The series is to be a modern adaptation of Shakespeare, told from female perspectives and led by an all-female production team. In December 2020, the company signed a first look deal with Amazon Studios for TV projects. The company is co-producing the dramedy Netflix series Maid (2021), inspired by Stephanie Land's memoir Maid: Hard Work, Low Pay, and a Mother's Will to Survive. It is also produced by Molly Smith Metzler, John Wells Productions and Warner Bros Television. LuckyChap Entertainment and Scott Free Productions are co-producing a film based on the Disney attraction Big Thunder Mountain Railroad. The script is being written by Michele and Kieran Mulroney, and it will be directed by Bert and Bertie.

Films

Television

References

External links
 

Film production companies of the United States
Television production companies of the United States
Entertainment companies established in 2014
American companies established in 2014
2014 establishments in the United States
2014 establishments in California
Companies established in 2014
Margot Robbie
Mass media companies established in 2014
Entertainment companies based in California
Companies based in Los Angeles